Adegunle Adewela was the 42nd Ooni of Ife, a paramount traditional ruler of Ile Ife, the ancestral home of the Yorubas. He succeeded Ooni Wunmonije and was succeeded by Ooni Degbinsokun.

References

Oonis of Ife
Yoruba history